Haris Cirak (born 14 March 1995) is a Swedish football midfielder who plays for GAIS.

Career
He hails from Strängnäs. He moved to Eskilstuna to play for Eskilstuna City FK and AFC Eskilstuna. While at AFC, he was loaned out to Norwegian club Elverum, first in the autumn of 2016 and later in the autumn of 2017. After the 2018 season, he moved to the Norwegian 1. divisjon on a permanent basis to play for Nest-Sotra. First-tier club Kristiansund BK signed him in 2019, but after half a season with 9 league games and 4 cup games he was sold back to Sweden and GAIS. In September 2019 he tore his cruciate ligament.

References

1995 births
Living people
Swedish footballers
Eskilstuna City FK players
AFC Eskilstuna players
Elverum Fotball players
Nest-Sotra Fotball players
Kristiansund BK players
GAIS players
Association football forwards
Association football midfielders
Swedish expatriate footballers
Expatriate footballers in Norway
Swedish expatriate sportspeople in Norway
Allsvenskan players
Superettan players
Norwegian First Division players
Eliteserien players
People from Strängnäs Municipality
Sportspeople from Södermanland County